Creth Hines (March 8, 1906 – October 7, 1982) was an American athlete. He competed in the men's javelin throw at the 1928 Summer Olympics.

References

External links
 

1906 births
1982 deaths
Athletes (track and field) at the 1928 Summer Olympics
American male javelin throwers
Olympic track and field athletes of the United States
Track and field athletes from Houston